Irv Smith may refer to:

Irv Smith Sr. (born 1971), American football tight end
Irv Smith Jr. (born 1998), American football tight end